Anselm Franz of Ingelheim (1683–1749) was Bishop of Würzburg from 1746 until his death in 1749.

In contrast to his predecessor Friedrich Karl von Schönborn and his older brother and his predecessor in Würzburg, Johann Philipp Franz von Schönborn, Anselm Franz von Ingelheim supported the architect Balthasar Neumann very little. Neumann was dismissed as a senior postmaster, but he remained an officer. Ingelheim was considered to be greedy, and was said to have had only interest in goldsmithery and alchemy, so that the building of the Würzburg Residenz was stagnating.
The Second Pentacle of Jupiter, from the Key of Solomon (Clavicula Salomonis) was reportedly found on his body, on the night of his death in 1749.

References

1683 births
1749 deaths
Prince-Bishops of Würzburg